The cryptic antthrush (Chamaeza meruloides), also known as Such's antthrush, is a species of bird in the family Formicariidae. It is endemic to Atlantic Forest in southeastern Brazil. Although first described almost 200 years ago, it was long overlooked (hence, cryptic) due to confusion with the rufous-tailed antthrush and short-tailed antthrush, which inhabit the same region. The cryptic antthrush is mainly found at altitudes above the short-tailed antthrush, but below the rufous-tailed antthrush. When Nicholas Aylward Vigors described this species in 1825, he based it on two specimens collected by George Such, and this is the reason for the other common name, Such's antthrush.

References

cryptic antthrush
Birds of the Atlantic Forest
Endemic birds of Brazil
cryptic antthrush
Taxonomy articles created by Polbot